The Farmer's Daughter is a 1928 American comedy film directed by Arthur Rosson and written by Garrett Graham, Frederica Sagor Maas and Gilbert Pratt. The film stars Marjorie Beebe, Frank Albertson, Arthur Stone, Lincoln Stedman, Jimmie Adams and Charles Middleton. The film was released on October 14, 1928, by Fox Film Corporation.

Cast      
Marjorie Beebe as Margerine Hopkins
Frank Albertson as Allan Boardman Jr.
Arthur Stone as J. Langley Smythe
Lincoln Stedman as Noah Busby
Jimmie Adams as Cicero Hopkins
Charles Middleton as Hiram Flint

References

External links
 

1928 films
1920s English-language films
Silent American comedy films
1928 comedy films
Fox Film films
Films directed by Arthur Rosson
American silent feature films
American black-and-white films
1920s American films